The 1956 Tampa Spartans football team represented the University of Tampa as an independent during the 1956 NCAA College Division football season. It was the Spartans' 20th season. The team was led by head coach Marcelino Huerta, in his fifth year, and played their home games at Phillips Field in Tampa, Florida. They finished with a record of seven wins and two losses (7–2).

Schedule

References

Tampa
Tampa Spartans football seasons
Tampa Spartans football